The 1987 Asian Basketball Confederation Championship for Men were held in Bangkok, Thailand.

Draw

* Withdrew

Preliminary round

Group A

Group B

Group C

Group D

Quarterfinal round

Group I

Group II

Group III

Group IV

Classification 13th–15th

Semifinals

13th place

Classification 9th–12th

Semifinals

11th place

9th place

Classification 5th–8th

Semifinals

7th place

5th place

Final round

Semifinals

3rd place

Final

Final standing

Awards

Most Valuable Player:  Lee Chung-Hee
All-Star Team:
  Zhang Bin
  Sun Fengwu
  Hur Jae
  Lee Chung-Hee
  Alvin Patrimonio

References

External links
 Results
 archive.fiba.com

Asia Championship, 1987
1987
B
B
November 1987 sports events in Thailand